Héctor Enrique Vasconcelos y Cruz is a Mexican diplomat. He is the former Mexican Ambassador to Denmark, Norway and Iceland. He was expected to be appointed the Mexican Secretary of Foreign Affairs (Mexico) by President Andrés Manuel López Obrador, but was subsequently replaced by Marcelo Ebrard on 5 July 2018 as he was elected to be senator instead. One of his main goals is to improve NAFTA.

Early years
He is the only child of politician and writer José Vasconcelos and pianist Esperanza Cruz.

He would study music in school.

Professional life

References

Living people
Alumni of the University of Oxford
Mexican diplomats
Year of birth missing (living people)
Ambassadors of Mexico to Denmark
Ambassadors of Mexico to Norway
Ambassadors of Mexico to Iceland